La Peur is an album of the French singer Johnny Hallyday.

Track listing

Le survivant
La peur
Veau d'or vaudou
Je n'en suis plus capable
Carte postale d'Alabama
Je suis victime de l'amour
Sans profession
Il nous faudra parler d'amour
Oublier
Faire face
Ma voix de révolte
Source:La peur track listing

References

https://web.archive.org/web/20091119115415/http://johnny-hallyday.over-blog.net/pages/Les_annees_80-1213534.html

1982 albums
Johnny Hallyday albums
Philips Records albums